Isotomurus is a genus of elongate-bodied springtails in the family Isotomidae. There are at least 40 described species in Isotomurus.

Species
These 40 species belong to the genus Isotomurus:

 Isotomurus aequalis (Macgillivray, 1896)
 Isotomurus aetnensis Carapelli, Frati, Fanciulli & Dallai, 2001
 Isotomurus alticolus (Carl, 1899)
 Isotomurus annectens Yosii, 1963
 Isotomurus atreus Christiansen & Bellinger, 1980
 Isotomurus balteatus (Reuter, 1876)
 Isotomurus beskidensis Rusek, 1963
 Isotomurus bidenticulata Tullberg, 1976
 Isotomurus bimus Christiansen & Bellinger, 1980
 Isotomurus cassagnaui Deharveng & Lek, 1993
 Isotomurus catalana Cassagnau, 1987
 Isotomurus cibus Christiansen & Bellinger, 1980
 Isotomurus denticulatus Kos, 1937
 Isotomurus festus Potapov, Porco & Deharveng, 2018
 Isotomurus fucicola (Schött, 1893)
 Isotomurus fucicolus (Reuter, 1891)
 Isotomurus gallicus Carapelli & al., 2001
 Isotomurus ghibellinus Carapelli, Frati, Fanciulli & Dallai, 1995
 Isotomurus graminis Fjellberg, 2007
 Isotomurus hadriaticus Carapelli, Frati, Fanciulli & Dallai, 2001
 Isotomurus italicus Carapelli & al., 1995
 Isotomurus keilbachi Palissa, 1969
 Isotomurus lateclavus Kos, 1937
 Isotomurus maculatus (Schaeffer, 1896)
 Isotomurus nebulosus Lek & Carapelli, 1998
 Isotomurus opala Christiansen & Bellinger, 1992
 Isotomurus palliceps (Uzel, 1891)
 Isotomurus palustris (Müller, 1776) (marsh springtail)
 Isotomurus palustroides Folsom, 1937
 Isotomurus plumosus Bagnall, 1940
 Isotomurus pseudopalustris Carapelli, Frati, Fanciulli & Dallai, 2001
 Isotomurus rabili Deharveng & Lek, 1993
 Isotomurus retardatus Folsom, 1937
 Isotomurus schaefferi (Krausbauer, 1947)
 Isotomurus stuxbergi (Tullberg, 1876)
 Isotomurus subterraneus Stach, 1946
 Isotomurus texensis Folsom, 1937
 Isotomurus tricolor (Packard, 1873)
 Isotomurus unifasciatus (Börner, 1901)
 Isotomurus viridipalustris Kos, 1937

References

Further reading

External links

 

Entomobryomorpha
Articles created by Qbugbot
springtail genera